

The Carden-Ford was a 1930s British aero-engine modified from a Ford motor car engine by Carden Aero Engines

The company saw a need for a cheap low-powered propulsion unit for ultralight aircraft and the engine was an adaptation of the well-proven and reliable Ford 10 Model C motor car engine. The engine was reversed, and a thrust bearing fitted to what was now the front of the engine. The chain drive was replaced by lightweight fibre gears, an Elektron aluminium alloy sump fitted, and dual ignition if requested. There were two cylinder head variants, one with an 'L' shape, the other with a low-profile flat head which required a separate header tank. This latter design was adapted for the elegant Chilton Aircraft Ltd Chilton D.W.1 Monoplane of 1936.

Variants
Carden-Ford 31 hp 4-cylinder
A much modified Ford 10 car engine.
Carden-Ford S.P.1
Further development of the 31 hp engine, with a centric supercharger, 1.1:1 gear ratio, splined propeller shaft extension and horizontal mounting for flush wing mounting. Used exclusively on the Carden-Baynes Bee

Application
 Broughton-Blayney Brawney
 B.A.C. Drone
 Chilton D.W.1 monoplane
 Carden-Baynes Bee
 Kronfeld Monoplane
 Mignet HM.14 (Flying Flea)
 Perman Parasol
 Taylor Watkinson Dingbat

Engine specifications (Carden-Ford 31 hp 4-cylinder)

Notes

References
Lumsden, Alec. British Piston Engines and their Aircraft. Marlborough, Wiltshire: Airlife Publishing, 1994. 

1930s aircraft piston engines